Alban Dashi (born 25 September 1989) is an Albanian football player.

External links

Profile at Partizani.Net

1989 births
Living people
People from Lezhë County
Association football forwards
Albanian footballers
FK Partizani Tirana players
KF Teuta Durrës players
KF Adriatiku Mamurrasi players